Salvadora is a genus of flowering plants in the family Salvadoraceae.

Species include:
Salvadora alii
Salvadora angustifolia
Salvadora australis	
Salvadora oleoides	
Salvadora persica

References

Sources
The Establishment of a New Genus of Plants, Called Salvadora, with Its Description. By L. Garcin of Neufchatel in Switzerland; Communicated in a Letter to Dr. Mortimer Secr. R. S Garcin, L. ''Philosophical Transactions.. (1683-1775). 1753-01-01. 46:47–53

Salvadoraceae